The largest ethnic groups in Rwanda are the Hutus, which make up about 85% of Rwanda's population; the Tutsis, which are 14%; and the Twa, which are around 1%. Starting with the Tutsi feudal monarchy rule of the 10th century, the Hutus were a subjugated social group. It was not until Belgian colonization that the tensions between the Hutus and Tutsis became focused on race, the Belgians propagating the myth that Tutsis were the superior ethnicity. The resulting tensions would eventually foster the slaughtering of tutsis in the Rwandan genocide. Since then, policy has changed to recognize one main ethnicity: "Rwandan".

In comparison to the Hutu (4.3% B), the Tutsi have three times as much genetic influence from Nilo-Saharan populations (14.9% B).

Genetics

Y-DNA (paternal lineages)
Modern-day genetic studies of the Y-chromosome generally indicate that the Tutsi, like the Hutu, are largely of Bantu extraction (60%E1b1a, 20% B, 4% E3). Paternal genetic influences associated with the Horn of Africa and North Africa are few (16% E1b1b), and are ascribed to much earlier inhabitants who were assimilated. However, the Tutsi have considerably more Nilo-Saharan paternal lineages (14.9% B) than the Hutu (4.3% B).

Trombetta et al. (2015) found 22.2% of E1b1b in a small sample of Tutsis from Burundi, but no bearers of the haplogroup among the local Hutu and Twa populations. The subclade was of the M293 variety, which suggests that the ancestors of Tutsis in this area may have assimilated some South Cushitic pastoralists.

mtDNA (maternal lineages)
There are no peer-reviewed genetic studies of the Tutsi's mtDNA or maternal lineages. However, Fornarino et al. (2009) report that unpublished data indicates that one Tutsi individual from Rwanda carries the India-associated mtDNA haplogroup R7.

Autosomal DNA (overall ancestry)
In general, the Tutsi appear to share a close genetic kinship with neighboring Bantu populations, particularly the Hutu. However, it is unclear whether this similarity is primarily due to extensive genetic exchanges between these communities through intermarriage or whether it ultimately stems from common origins:

[...]generations of gene flow obliterated whatever clear-cut physical distinctions may have once existed between these two Bantu peoples – renowned to be height, body build, and facial features. With a spectrum of physical variation in the peoples, Belgian authorities legally mandated ethnic affiliation in the 1920s, based on economic criteria. Formal and discrete social divisions were consequently imposed upon ambiguous biological distinctions. To some extent, the permeability of these categories in the intervening decades helped to reify the biological distinctions, generating a taller elite and a shorter underclass, but with little relation to the gene pools that had existed a few centuries ago. The social categories are thus real, but there is little if any detectable genetic differentiation between Hutu and Tutsi.

Tishkoff et al. (2009) found their mixed Hutu and Tutsi samples from Rwanda to be predominately of Bantu origin, with minor gene flow from Afro-Asiatic communities (17.7% Afro-Asiatic genes found in the mixed Hutu/Tutsi population).

Pre-colonial background of Rwanda 
When Europeans first explored the region around the Great Lakes of the Rift Valley in Africa that has since become Rwanda, they created an interpretation of the people found in the region as three racially distinct tribes, coexisting in a complex social order: the Tutsis, Hutus, and Twa. The Tutsis, an elite minority of about 24% of the population, were tall, slim pastoralists. The Hutu majority, about 75% of the population, were stocky, strong farmers. And the Twa were a marginalized minority of 1% of the population: a tribe of pygmies, dwelling in the forests as hunters and gatherers.

Although these groups were distinct and stratified in relation to one another, the boundary between Tutsi and Hutu was somewhat open to social mobility. The Tutsi elite were defined by their exclusive ownership of land and cattle. Hutus, however, though disenfranchised socially and politically, could shed Hutuness, or kwihutura, by accumulating wealth, and thereby rising through the social hierarchy to the status of Tutsi.

A contrasting picture of human cultural diversity was recorded in the early Rwandan oral histories, ritual texts, and biographies, in which the terms Tutsi, Hutu, and Twa were quite rarely used and had meanings different from those conceived by the Europeans. In those, the term Tutsi was equivalent to the phrase "wealthy noble"; Hutu meant "farmer"; and Twa was used to refer to people skilled in hunting, use of fire, pottery-making, guarding, etc.  In contrast to the European conception, rural farmers are often described as wealthy and well-connected.  Kings sometimes looked down on them but still formed marriage bonds with them and are frequently described as conferring titles, land, herds, armies, servitors, and ritual functions on them.

Origin myths 
Elites in pre-colonial Rwanda propagated an origin myth of the three groups to justify the hierarchical relationship of sociopolitical inequality between them in sacred, religious terms. According to this myth, Kigwa, a deity who fell from heaven, had three sons: Gatwa, Gahutu and Gatutsi. He chose an heir by giving each son the responsibility of watching over a pot of milk during the night. Gatwa drank the milk, Gahutu fell asleep and carelessly spilt his pot, and only Gatutsi kept watch, keeping his milk safe. Therefore, Kigwa appointed Gatutsi to be his successor, and Gahutu to be his brother's servant, while Gatwa was to be resigned to the status of an outsider. Gatutsi would possess cattle and power, and Gahutu would only be allowed to acquire cattle through service to Gatutsi, whereas Gatwa was condemned to the fringe of society. This myth was the basis of the hierarchical relationship that placed the Tutsi at the apex of the social pyramid: above the Hutu, who were in turn above the marginalized Twa. The prevalence of this myth became the basis of the social and political stratification of Rwanda.

From the fifteenth century, when the Tutsi arrived in what is now Rwanda as migrant pastoralists, to the onset of colonization, Rwanda was a feudal monarchy. A Tutsi monarch ruled, distributing land and political authority through hereditary chiefs whose power was manifest in their land and cattle ownership. Most of these chiefs were Tutsis. The land was farmed under an imposed system of patronage under which Tutsi chiefs demanded manual labor in return for the rights of Hutus to occupy their land. This system left Hutus with the status of serfs. Additionally, when Rwanda conquered the peoples on its borders, their ethnic identities were cast aside and they were simply labeled "Hutu". Therefore, "Hutu" became an identity that was not necessarily ethnic, but rather just associated with subjugation.

Stratified social hierarchy 
This social system was based on five fundamental assumptions, as reinforced through group interactions and influenced by cultural myths:

 That there were fundamental natural differences between the groups
 That the origin of the Tutsi was celestial
 That the civilization that the Tutsi brought to Rwanda was superior
 That the kingship of the Tutsi Mwami was divinely ordained and
 That divine sanctions would occur if the monarchy was usurped by any other group.

Despite the stratification promulgated by these ideas, Rwanda was still very much a unified society. Notwithstanding association with different groups in the sociopolitical hierarchy, the inhabitants all considered themselves part of the same nation, the Banyarwanda, which means "people of Rwanda." They spoke the same language, practiced the same cultural traditions, and worshiped the same God. However, the arrival of European colonizers would later exploit group divisions as a means of securing control. 
The modern conception of Tutsi and Hutu as distinct ethnic groups in no way reflects the pre-colonial relationship between them. Tutsi and Hutu were simply groups occupying different places in the Rwandan social hierarchy, the division between which was exacerbated by slight differences in appearance propagated by occupation and pedigree.

German and Belgian colonization 
Some European intellectuals argue that the construction of divergent ethnic "Tutsi" and "Hutu" identities was formulated during the era of European colonization from the late 1880s to the 1950s. German colonialism did little to alter the existing stratified social system. The Germans were not interested in disrupting social affairs – their sole concern was the efficient extraction of natural resources and trade of profitable cash crops. Colonial bureaucrats relied heavily on native Tutsi chiefs to maintain order over the Hutu lower classes and collect taxes. Thus, the German affirmation of the stratified social structure was utilized by the Tutsi aristocracy as justification for minority rule over the lower-class Hutu masses. Germany's defeat in World War I allowed Belgian forces to conquer Rwanda. Belgian involvement in the region was far more intrusive than German administration. In an era of Social Darwinism, European anthropologists claimed to identify a distinct "Hamitic race" that was superior to native "Negroid" populations. Influenced by racialized attitudes, Belgian social scientists declared that the Tutsis, who wielded political control in Rwanda, must be descendants of the Hamites, who shared a purported closer blood line to Europeans. The Belgians concluded that the Tutsis and Hutus composed two fundamentally different ethno-racial groups. Thus, the Belgians viewed the Tutsis as more civilized, superior, but most importantly, more European than the Hutus. This perspective justified placing societal control in the hands of the Tutsis at the expense of the Hutus. Moreover, this Belgian affirmation of the Hamitic theory provided a conceptual foundation for Tutsis and Hutus to start identifying themselves as different ethnic groups. The Belgians established a comprehensive race theory that was to dictate Rwandan society until independence: Tutsi racial superiority and Hutu oppression. The institutionalization of Tutsi and Hutu ethnic divergence was accomplished through administrative, political economic, and educational means.

Primarily, Belgian colonialism stressed physical and social differences. Relentless Belgian propaganda portrayed Tutsis as the more evolved "ethnic" group in appearance, intelligence, and height, while Hutus were branded as ignorant, backwards, and vile.
Tutsis naturally welcomed this ethnic schism because thinking in these racialized terms had tangible social benefits – it vindicated their minority domination over the majority Hutus. This administrative propaganda had a subconscious effect of convincing Hutus and Tutsis that they were in fact members of separate ethnic, not social groups. For Belgian colonial elites, this was a classic "divide and conquer" strategy: cleaving groups along salient social boundaries served as a mechanism in securing colonial control over indigenous groups. Initially, Belgian administrators used an expedient method of classification based on the number of cattle a person owned – anyone with ten or more cattle was considered a member of the aristocratic Tutsi class. However, the presence of wealthy Hutu was problematic. Then in 1933, the colonial administration institutionalized a more rigid ethnic classification by issuing ethnic identification cards; every Rwandan was officially branded a Tutsi, Hutu, or Twa.

Tutsi political & economic hegemony 
One theory suggests that Belgian promotion of Tutsi political domination served as a prime catalyst of growing ethnic resentments. The Belgians dismantled Hutu kingdoms that had maintained local control in the northwest.  In 1926 the Belgians abolished the local posts of "land-chief," "cattle-chief" and "military chief," and in doing so they stripped the Hutus of their limited local power over land. Instead, they entrenched an authoritarian Tutsi aristocracy to rule over the Hutu majorities in which Tutsis took over as provincial governors, local chieftains, and civil bureaucrats. Hutu officials were excluded from local administrative structures while Hutu chieftains were systematically denied from ruling their own people as they had done for centuries before. The establishment of Tutsi minority rule created much bitterness among the Hutu majority who felt disenfranchised and politically repressed. This political resentment fueled the development of an ethnic gulf between the Tutsis who wielded political power, and the Hutus who were locked out of power.

Belgian economic policies also further increased the ethnic divide between Tutsis and Hutus. Colonial elites appropriated large land grants to Tutsis, and displaced formerly wealthy Hutu landowners. The Belgians strengthened the feudal arrangement of Rwanda's pre-colonial past by forcing Hutus to work on lands owned by Tutsis. Moreover, Tutsis were appointed as trade officials and tax collectors, further reinforcing Tutsi economic hegemony over the Hutus. Colonial policies deepened the pre-existing class stratification: Tutsis were primarily upper-class wealthy landowners and merchants, while Hutus occupied lower-class occupations as poor farmers and laborers. These deep class differences provided a framework for mapping ethnic identities on top of them: class-hatred was a prominent tool for fueling divergent ethno-nationalist ideologies. Thus, this socioeconomic stratification was a chief driver in formulating both ethnic identities: the oppression of the Hutus by the Tutsis served as a key catalyst in forming a common Hutu identity among the exploited lower classes, while the Tutsi economic supremacy over the Hutus served as a key catalyst in shaping a singular Tutsi identity among the privileged upper classes.

Lastly, the education system reinforced the bifurcation of Tutsi and Hutu ethnic identity. The Roman Catholic Church, the primary educators in the country, subscribed to the differences between Hutus and Tutsis by developing separate educational systems for each. Not surprisingly, in the 1940s and 1950s, the vast majority of students were Tutsis, even though the majority of Rwandans now self-identified as Hutus.

Hutu race theory 
Current anthropologists argue that the sum totality of these colonial measures fashioned a resentful inferiority complex among the Hutus. Although the Hamitic theory was jointly utilized by the Belgians and the Tutsis to systematically oppress the Hutu, the Hutu themselves internalized the hypothesis and flipped it around as a framework for viewing the Tutsi.  Hutu intellectuals re-framed the race theory as a defense mechanism: Hutu inferiority evolved into rightful supremacy in Rwanda, while Tutsi superiority evolved into an illegitimate foreignness to rule in Rwanda. Tutsis were viewed not as the rightful rulers that the Belgians claimed they were, but as foreigners from northeast Africa who invaded "rightful" Hutu territories. This Hutu reconstruction of the myth of Tutsi foreignness was disseminated and propagated as a reaction to "unjust" Tutsi rule.

The ethnic security dilemma
Other theoretical frameworks can also explain the construction of ethnic divergence between Tutsis and Hutus. First, the creation of salient ethnic identities can be seen as a better mechanism of capturing class resentment on the part of Hutus; layering an ethnic dimension over class identities was a better strategy for mobilizing the masses and legitimizing resistance against upper-class, ethnically different Tutsis. Second, a reworking of Michael Mann’s security dilemma in the Rwandan case produces the "ethnic" security dilemma: Hutus perceived that the Tutsis were forming a distinct ethnic identity, pushed by the Belgians, to legitimize political control. Whether or not this perception was true, as Mann's classic security dilemma maintains, Hutus responded to this supposed "ethnic attack" by forming their own ethnic identity. In reaction to being labeled the superior ethnic group by the Belgians and in the face of rising Hutu ethnicity, the Tutsis actually accepted and internalized this ethnic label, promoting Tutsi ethnic identity as a defense. This ethnic security dilemma model is a feasible theoretical explanation for the construction of divergent ethnic identities.

Identifying when in historical time these social group differences became ethnic differences is hard to pinpoint. There was no one crystallization point. The long process of constructing ethnicity, however, continued and strengthened in post-colonial years.

Post-colonial framework 
The predominant American theory regarding this period is that as Belgium's era of colonial dominance over Rwanda drew to a close during the 1950s, the Hutu and Tutsi, as racial identities, had been firmly institutionalized. Manipulative racial engineering by the Belgians, and the despotic practices of the Tutsi chieftains they empowered, helped drive together the disparate Rwandan sub-classes under the "Hutu" moniker. When the Belgians were to finally leave Rwanda in the early years of the 1960s, the politics of racial and ethnic division remained. And in the following decades, regimes under both Hutu ultra-nationalists and moderate conciliators would demonstrate how the labels of Hutu and Tutsi could be molded and twisted to fit political expediency.

Racialization of Hutu and Tutsi identities Under Kayibanda
Communist intellectuals argue that despite their systematic oppression, a class of Hutu political intelligentsia influenced by contemporary communist thought emerged, forming a stance against elite rule of the proletariat masses, which was reinterpreted as Tutsi rule over the Hutu. This Hutu counter-elite exploded onto the political scene in the late 1950s as both Belgian colonial influence and their firm support of the Tutsi minority declined. The emerging Hutu counter-elite provided a voice to the majority "Hutu" people, via a series of political proclamations and, later, sweeping electoral victories. Yet the voice that emerged was one embittered by decades of subjugation; one which championed Hutu nationalism and anti-Tutsi sentiment. The result was a "Hutu political consciousness" driven by populist and nationalistic forces, with the goal of dethroning the privileged Tutsi and driving a deeper wedge between their peoples.

In 1957, these Hutu nationalist elites made their political debut when a UN mission to the region was greeted with two declarations of independence by the Rwandan people. The first, a proclamation by the Mwami's (king's) high council proposed a rapid transfer of power from the Belgians to the Tutsi royal leadership. Called Mise au Point, the document emphasized the importance of ending racial tensions between white colonizers and black colonials. One month later, the Hutu political elites responded with their own declaration, the "Bahutu Manifesto". This document called for a double liberation of the Hutu people, first from the race of white colonials, and second from the race of Hamitic oppressors, the Tutsi. The document in many ways established the future tone of the Hutu nationalist movement by identifying the "indigenous racial problem" of Rwanda as the social, political, and economic "monopoly which is held by one race, the Tutsi." The manifesto also served as a prescient omen that future political identities in Rwanda would be defined along racial identities.

At the beginning of the Social Revolution of 1959 two years later, four major political parties emerged: two Tutsi monarchist parties, Union Nationale Rwandaise (UNAR) and Rassemblement Democratique Rwandais (RADER), and two Hutu parties, the nationalist Mouvement Democratique Rwandais / Parti du Mouvement et de L’Emancipacion Hutu (MDR-PARMEHUTU), and the moderate constitutionalists L’Association pour la Promotion Sociale de la Masse (APROSOMA). This marked the first time in Rwandan history that such stark party identification had emerged along exclusively ethnic lines. Not all parties championed segregation of the Hutu and Tutsi people, yet the divide ensured that the socio-political differentiation pioneered under colonialism would continue to flourish in independence.

In the ensuing provisional elections, the nationalist party of Grégoire Kayibanda (MDR-PARMEHUTU) rose to the fore. This victory gave PARMEHUTU an apparent mandate to initiate their program of segregation and discrimination against the Tutsi. Soon, Kayibanda would find the political cover he needed to consolidate control over Rwandan politics and excise the Tutsi from the political arena. In November and December 1963, a series of small cross border raids were carried out by expatriated Tutsi who had fled Rwanda between 1959 and 1963, during the tumultuous rise of Hutu nationalist politics. These exiles, publicly termed the inyenzi, ("cockroaches") by Kayibandi, were portrayed by the Hutu government as different from the domestic Tutsi only by the extremism of their political beliefs, and thus domestic Tutsi were often suspected of being collaborators in the raids. Building on this suspicion, PARMEHUTU overtly demonized and excised the Tutsi minority, politically and socially, in the wake of the 1963 raids. Disorganized reprisal killings against Tutsi were carried out at the local level, with minimal government intervention. Kayibandi, meanwhile, ordered the execution of almost two dozen leading moderate Tutsi political figures, effectively decapitating the domestic Tutsi opposition parties. This left the extremist Tutsi in exile as the only remaining Tutsi political force in the region, and prime targets for future demonization.

By the end of 1963, PARMEHUTU had established its political supremacy in Rwanda, with Kayibanda as president. Also established, in the public view, was the ever-present threat of external Tutsi invasion, the suspicion of which often translated to reprisals against the domestic Tutsi population. By 1964, Kayibandi had stepped in to quell the reprisal killings, but the sociopolitical position of the Tutsi minority continued to diminish. Under the ensuing decade of PARMEHUTU rule, all Tutsi were removed from public office, their enrollment in the public education system was curtailed, and they were relegated to second-class citizen status. Perhaps most importantly, the government continued, via official literature and the public education system, to characterize the Hutu/Tutsi divide as racial in nature, not ethnic. The purpose of this distinction was that, via a "racial" differentiation, Tutsi could be characterized as alien, non-indigenous, and thus not genuine Rwandan nationals; whereas ethnic differentiations could perceivably exist within a single national identity. Under Kayibanda, domestic Tutsi were viewed not as Rwandan citizens by the Hutu government, but as domestic aliens to be tolerated; participatory in civil life, yet removed from the political sphere and from its corresponding rights and protections.

Ethnization of Hutu/Tutsi identity under Habyarimana 
In July 1973 a Tutsi massacre of Hutu elites in neighboring Burundi triggered another flare-up of domestic racial tension in Rwanda, in which domestic Tutsi were again blamed for the actions of their foreign "counterparts." As was the case in 1963, political and physical reprisals were initiated against domestic Tutsis, beginning with the black-listing of Tutsi students from state universities, and spreading to broader society.

Eventually, domestic violence and disruption became so severe that Major General Juvénal Habyarimana led  the army in a coup, overthrowing the nationalistic PARMEHUTU regime and establishing the second republic. The second republic, a single-party military regime under Habyarimana, sought to roll back the racializing policies of his predecessor responsible for domestic discord. The Hutu/Tutsi divide was reclassified by the government as "ethnic," not racial, and the moratorium on Tutsi government participation was lifted (but Tutsi participation in government remained low). Quota systems were established for ethnic participation in education and public sector jobs; attempting to proportionally distribute participation between the Hutu and Tutsi ethnic groups. In this case, however, participation for the historically better educated Tutsi remained inflated. In his stated quest to redress historical wrongs, Habyarimana committed the government to a policy of "reconciliation." However, a reclassification of the Hutu/Tutsi differentiation from racial to ethnic was not equivalent to a repudiation of the differentiation itself, and discrimination was still prevalent in society and policy. Although the "Tutsi" were defined by the state as an ethnic minority, they were denied recognition as a protected minority and remained conspicuously absent from elected offices. 
Some vestiges of the old regime remained codified as well, such as the law that Hutu military officials were not allowed to marry Tutsi women. As well, Habyarimana assured the Hutu majority that a Hutu leader would always be the "leader and protector" of the republic. Thus, Juvénal Habyarimana still defined the terms of the "reconciliation" as Tutsis remained politically subservient under his regime.

Perhaps most insidiously, however, was how the transition to the Habyarimana regime illustrated the ease and means by which Rwandan national regimes could redraw and manipulate the racial/ethnic divisions of their own people in order to fit their own political agendas. Despite years of relative peace following the formation of the 2nd republic, Habyarimana's goals of reconciliation ultimately failed. Hutu/Tutsi differences remained codified in law. When Habyarimana's government began the transition to a democratic system in the late 1980s, it was perhaps inevitable that divisions would manifest once again along Hutu/Tutsi lines. As well, popular Hutu resentment at the disproportional representation of Tutsi in the quota system meant that friction between the groups never truly dissipated. Some political scientists credit these failures as a few of the reasons why Rwanda so quickly slipped back into political turmoil along ethnic lines in the years immediately preceding the 1994 genocide.

Ethnic identity cards in contemporary Rwanda
In 1933 Rwanda's Belgian administration issued identity cards—a policy that would remain for over a half-a-century and one that would not create ethnicity, but instead would ensure its proof and social salience. These instruments of documentation would be key in fomenting Rwanda's devastating genocide in 1994.

During the early 1990s the Hutus—who comprised a significant majority of the Rwandan population—were being manipulated as political tools by President Juvénal Habyarimana's regime. Under an imposed order to democratize, Habyarimana rallied the majority Hutus against what he depicted as their racial enemy—the Tutsis—in a measure to prevent both regional and class division from becoming politically relevant issues. Thus, this political climate ensured that national identity would be defined singularly across ethnic lines—a dangerous prelude to the ensuing genocide. The tense situation became inflamed with Habyarimana's mysterious death in 1994. Quickly, Hutu administration implemented a policy to kill any and all Tutsi—a process believed to be simplified by identity cards.

Flexibility of ethnic identification 
Identity cards became the subject of paranoia as this form of identification allowed the reinvention of personal identity through illegal forging; during the genocide, "mistakes" were often made because of this flexibility in identity. In particular, because a Rwandan's ethnic identity was solely traced through paternal lineage, there was considerable difficulty in establishing true paternity. Furthermore, inter-marriage particularly in the Southern region of the country furthered suspicion over Hutu or Tutsi paternity. Though forging was rare, the doubt over ethnic identity served as proof that unlike the rhetoric of Rwandan government, and that of the preceding Belgian colonizers, ethnicity was not primordialist in nature. Instead, ethnicity was a socially-constructed, superimposed identity that could potentially be changed, regardless of identity card issuance.

The end of the Rwandan Civil War resulted in a Tutsi government gaining power—the Rwandan Patriotic Front (RPF). This shift in power provided the minority Tutsi with access to power and privilege, completely shifting social conceptions. Attempts to re-build the war-torn country focused on eclipsing identity for fear that retaliation and punishment towards the Hutus would occur. The government's agenda thus was to reduce identity to that of just being "Rwandan". In this post-genocide society, identity was supposedly re-conceptualized to divert the emphasis from ethnicity to a division of the population into categories of victim, victors, survivors, and perpetrators.

New social identities 
However, in identifying victims and survivors, some Rwandans are left to be identified as perpetrators. This becomes increasingly problematic as all Hutus are deemed perpetrators—where their survival of the genocide seems to imply some form of complicity with the former government. Thus, in this process of rebuilding and bringing guilty parties to justice, the current government is providing dangling linkages back to the very ethnicities they wish to abolish and is risking further entrenching supposed "past" ethnic divisions.

Furthermore, government policy to reduce identity to "just a Rwandan one" has only "been successful in the public sphere of government rhetoric and bureaucracy." In fact, ethnicity still remains socially relevant. Its salience however has been transferred into the private sphere—a space that may make the divisions even more destructive. Thus, the concept of "eliminating" ethnicity is problematic in both concept and reality—as it is unreasonable to expect such a drastic change in the Rwandan perception.

See also 
Ethnic groups in Burundi

References